The 2010 congressional elections in Oklahoma were held on November 2, 2010, to determine who would represent the state of Oklahoma in the United States House of Representatives. Oklahoma has five seats in the House, apportioned according to the 2000 United States census. This election was the final one held in which Congressional districts apportioned according to the 2000 U.S. Census data. Representatives are elected for two-year terms; those elected serve in the 112th Congress from January 3, 2011 until January 3, 2013.

Overview

By district
Results of the 2010 United States House of Representatives elections in Oklahoma by district:

District 1

This district is represented by Republican John Sullivan. Republican candidates, Craig Allen, Nathan Dahm, Fran Moghaddam, Kenneth Rice, Patrick K. Haworth and Independent Angelia O'Dell all have filed to run against Sullivan. Sullivan entered the Betty Ford Center in California to receive treatment for his addiction to alcohol on May 28, 2009.

Democratic primary

Candidates
None announced

Republican primary

Candidates
 John Sullivan, Incumbent
 Kenneth Rice
 Nathan Dahm, Former Missionary
 Patrick Haworth
 Craig Allen
 Fran Moghaddam

Results

General Election

District 2

This district is represented by Democrat Dan Boren. Democrat Jim Wilson and Republicans Daniel Edmonds, Charles Thompson, Chester Clem Falling, Daniel Arnett, Howard Houchen, and Raymond Wickson all filed to run against Boren.

Polling
Despite the poor approval ratings of Obama, of whom 27% in this district approve, and the high unpopularity of the Democratic healthcare bills, which were opposed by 17% of second district residents, conservative Democrat Boren remains popular.

Boren vs. Edmonds

Boren vs. Thompson

Boren vs. Houchen

Boren vs. Arnett

Democratic primary

Candidates
 Dan Boren, of Muskogee, incumbent
 Jim Wilson

Results

Republican primary

Candidates
 Daniel Arnett, Henryetta
 Daniel Edmonds, of Morris
 Chester Clem Falling
 Howard Houchen, of Hugo
 Charles Thompson, of Hulbert
 Raymond Wickson

Results
There was a runoff election between Daniel Edmonds and Charles Thompson on August 24. Charles Thompson was chosen to run against Dan Boren in November.

General Election

District 3

This district is represented by Republican Frank Lucas. Democrat, Frankie Robbins, has filed to run for this office against Lucas. There will be no primary election for district 3

District 4

This district is represented by Republican Tom Cole. Republican, RJ Harris, ran for this seat against Cole., no Democrats contested this district.

Results

General Election

District 5

This district was represented by Republican Mary Fallin, but the seat was opened as she has announced her candidacy for Governor of Oklahoma. The seat attracted the attention of several Republican candidates, including State Representative Mike Thompson, former State Representative Kevin Calvey, whom Fallin defeated in the 2006 Republican primary for this seat, physician Johnny Roy, who also ran in 2006, Harry Johnson, Rick Flanigan, Shane Jett and Baptist General Convention of Oklahoma  employee James Lankford, as well as Democrats Tom Guild and Billy Coyle. Ultimately Republican James Lankford and Democrat Billy Coyle won their respective parties' nominations and faced off in the general election in November.

This district includes most of Oklahoma City as well as Pottawatomie and Seminole counties.

Democratic primary

Candidates
 Billy Coyle, of Oklahoma City
 Tom Guild, of Edmond

Results

Republican primary

Candidates
James Lankford, Program Director of Falls Creek
Kevin Calvey, Former State Representative
Mike Thompson, Former State Representative
Harry Johnson
Rick Flanigan
Johnny Roy
Shane Jett, State Representative

Polling
First Choice Polling

Second Choice Polling

Results
There was a runoff election held on August 24 between James Lankford and Kevin Calvey. Lankford was chosen to run against Billy Coyle in November.

General Election

Key 
* A district that has a PVI of a party that is represented by the opposite party, and applies to an EVEN score

See also 
 2010 United States Senate election in Oklahoma
 2010 Oklahoma gubernatorial election

Notes

References

External links 
 Oklahoma State Election Board
 U.S. Congress Candidates for Oklahoma at Project Vote Smart
 Oklahoma U.S. House from OurCampaigns.com
 Campaign contributions for U.S. Congressional races in Oklahoma from OpenSecrets
 2010 Oklahoma General Election graph of multiple polls from Pollster.com

 House - Oklahoma from the Cook Political Report

 News coverage from The Oklahoman

Oklahoma
2010
2010 Oklahoma elections